Pollock is a surname. In some cases, it originates as a locative name derived from Upper Pollock, Renfrewshire, Scotland. An early bearer of a form of this surname is Peter de Pollok, in about 1172–1178. In other cases, the surname is derived from the Middle English personal name *Pollok (Old English *Pulloc). An early bearer of a form of this surname is Roger Pollok, in 1332.

People surnamed Pollock
 A. J. Pollock (born 1987), American baseball player
 Alexander Pollock, Canadian actor
 Alexander Pollock (politician), Scottish parliamentarian
 Algernon J. Pollock (1864–1957), Evangelist and writer from the Plymouth Brethren movement
 Allyson Pollock, Scottish professor of public health policy
 Andrew Pollock (disambiguation)
 Andrew Maclean Pollock (1914–1969), Scottish-born South African cricketer
 Andrew Graeme Pollock (born 1969), South African cricketer, son of Andrew Maclean Pollock
Bertram Pollock (1863–1943), Anglican bishop
 Carl Arthur Pollock (1903–1978), Canadian businessman
 Channing Pollock (disambiguation)
 Charles Edward Pollock (1823–1897), English judge
 Craig Pollock (born 1956), F1 manager
 Daniel Pollock (1969–1992), Australian actor
 Daniel C. Pollock (1913–2007), United States Marine Corps colonel and Navy Cross recipient
David Pollock (disambiguation)
 David Pollock (judge) (1780 –1847), British judge in India
 David Pollock (actor) (born 1961), former American child actor
 David Pollock (rugby union) (born 1987), rugby union player for Ulster Rugby
 David Pollock, 3rd Viscount Hanworth (born 1946), British peer, academic and Labour member of the House of Lords
 David Pollock (humanist) (born 1942), British secular humanist
 Dave Pollock (born 1942), former Australian politician
 David C. Pollock (1939–2004), sociologist
 Dee Pollock (1937–2005), American film and television actor
 J. Donald Pollock (1868–1962), Rector of Edinburgh University
 Eddie Pollock (born 1957), Scottish cricketer
 Edward Pollock (1823–1858), American poet
 Edwin A. Pollock (1899–1982), United States Marine Corps general and Navy Cross recipient
 Edwin Taylor Pollock (1870–1943), Captain, USN
 Eileen Pollock (1947–2020), Northern Irish actress
 Eileen "Mike" Pollock, American screenwriter
 Eliza Pollock (1840–1919), American archer
 Emma Pollock, Scottish Musician
 Ernest Pollock, 1st Viscount Hanworth (1861–1936), English Attorney General
 Fergus Pollock, British automobile designer
 Francis Pollock (1876–1957), Canadian science fiction writer
 Sir Frederick Pollock, 1st Baronet (1783–1870), British lawyer and politician
 Sir Frederick Pollock, 3rd Baronet (1845–1937), British jurist 
 F. H. Pollock Frederick Hart Pollock (1842–1908), actor and theatrical manager in Australia
 Friedrich Pollock (1894–1970), German philosopher and economist
 Gale Pollock, acting U.S. Army Deputy Surgeon General
 George Pollock (1786–1872), British field marshal
 George Pollock (Australian politician) (1890–1939), speaker of the Legislative Assembly of Queensland
 George Pollock (director) (1907–1979), English film director
 George David Pollock (1817–1897), British surgeon
George Frederick Pollock (1821–1915), British lawyer
 Graeme Pollock (born 1944), South African cricketer
 Griselda Pollock (born 1949), British art historian
Harry Frederick Pollock (1857–1901), British lawyer and politician
 Henry Pollock (1864–1953), Hong Kong politician and barrister
 Henry W. Pollock (1878–1954), New York state senator
 Howard Wallace Pollock (1920–2011), American politician 
 Hugh Alexander Pollock (1888–1971), British editor, soldier and husband of Enid Blyton and Ida Pollock
 Hugh MacDowell Pollock (1852–1937), Northern Ireland Minister of Finance
 Ida Pollock, romance novelist and centenarian; wife of Hugh Pollock
 Jackson Pollock (1912–1956), American artist
 Jame Pollock (born 1979), Canadian ice hockey player
 James Pollock (American politician) (1810–1890), Governor of Pennsylvania
 James Dalgleish Pollock VC (1890–1958), British soldier
 Jamie Pollock (born 1974), English footballer
 Jamie Pollock (woman soccer player), American soccer player
 Jean-Yves Pollock, French linguist and professor
 Jim Pollock (born 1930), Canadian politician
 John L. Pollock (1940–2009), American philosopher
 Kevin Pollock (born 1970), Canadian referee in the National Hockey League
Linda Pollock, historian of early modern England and professor at Tulane University 
 Lloyd Pollock (1909–1993), president of the Canadian Amateur Hockey Association
 Mark Pollock, blind Northern Irish adventurer.
 Mary Pollock, pseudonym used by Enid Blyton
 Michael Pollock, British Admiral of the Fleet and First Sea Lord
 Michael Pollock (tenor) (1921—2003), American operatic tenor, opera director, and voice teacher
 Mike Pollock (voice actor) (born 1965), American actor
 Mike Pollock (rugby league), New Zealand rugby league footballer who played in the 1910s and 1920s
 Oliver Pollock (1737–1823), American Revolutionary and financier
 Paul Pollock (born 1986), Irish Marathon runner and medical doctor
 Peter Pollock (born 1941), South African cricketer
 Robert Pollock (disambiguation)
 Robert Pollock (actor) (born 1960), New Zealand actor
 Robert L. Pollock, business writer for The Wall Street Journal
 Robert M. Pollock (1856–1920), Republican member of the North Dakota House of Representatives
 Robert Mason Pollock (1926–2012), American television writer
 Robert A. Pollock (1930–2003), footballer turned writer-novelist who wrote the novel Loophole
 Robert Pollok (1798–1827), Scottish poet best known for The Course of Time
 Robert Pollok (British Army officer) (1884–1979), Irish-born British Army officer
 Sam Pollock (1925–2007), Canadian hockey manager
 Sharon Pollock (1936–2021), Canadian playwright
 Shaun Pollock (born 1973), South African cricketer
 Sheldon Pollock, American Sanskritist
 Wellesca Pollock (1871–1940), American educator
 William H. K. Pollock (1859–1896), chess player
Sir William Frederick Pollock, 2nd Baronet (1815–1888), British lawyer
 William P. Pollock (1870–1922), Senator from South Carolina

Fictional people named Pollock
Bertie Pollock

Other
 Clan Pollock, Scottish clan
 Pollock baronets

See also
 Pollack (surname)
 Pollock (disambiguation)

Citations

References

English-language surnames
Surnames of Scottish origin